Hesperentomon is a genus of proturans in the family Hesperentomidae.

Species
 Hesperentomon chinghaiense Yin, 1982
 Hesperentomon dianicum Yin, Xie & Imadaté, 1994
 Hesperentomon dunhuaense Bu, Shrubovych & Yin, 2011
 Hesperentomon fopingense Bu, Shrubovych & Yin, 2011
 Hesperentomon guiyangense Tang & Yin, 1991
 Hesperentomon huashanense Yin, 1982
 Hesperentomon kangdingense Tang & Yin, 1988
 Hesperentomon kuratai Imadaté, 1989
 Hesperentomon macswaini Price, 1960
 Hesperentomon martynovae Szeptycki, 1988
 Hesperentomon monlunicum Yin, 1984
 Hesperentomon pectigastrulum Yin, 1984
 Hesperentomon sichuanense Tang & Yin, 1988
 Hesperentomon tianshanicum Martynova, 1970

References

Protura